Udhayathara (born Sijo Varghese on 16 March 1988) is an Indian actress, who predominantly acts in Tamil and Malayalam cinema but also appears in Kannada and Telugu films.

Filmography

References

External links 
 

Indian film actresses
Actresses in Malayalam cinema
Actresses in Kannada cinema
Living people
Actresses from Kerala
Actresses in Tamil cinema
1988 births
21st-century Indian actresses